HMS Earl of Peterborough  was a First World War Royal Navy , named after Charles Mordaunt, 3rd Earl of Peterborough, a British general of the War of the Spanish Succession who fought in Spain. The ship's original 12-inch main battery was stripped from an obsolete , .

The Lord Clive-class monitors were originally built in 1915 to engage German shore artillery in occupied Belgium during the First World War. Earl of Peterborough, however was differently employed, being dispatched to the Eastern Mediterranean upon completion for service with the fleet there. Early in 1916 she shelled Turkish positions in the Dardanelles and during the remainder of the war was active against Turkish units in Egypt, Palestine and Turkey itself.

Following the armistice in November 1918, Earl of Peterborough and her sisters were put into reserve pending scrapping, as the reason for their existence ended with the liberation of Central Power-led coastlines. In 1921 Earl of Peterborough was scrapped along with all her sisters.

References 
 
 
 
 

 

Lord Clive-class monitors
Ships built in Belfast
1915 ships
World War I monitors of the United Kingdom
Royal Navy ship names
Ships built by Harland and Wolff